Hazlewood with Storiths is a civil parish in the Craven district of North Yorkshire, England.
The population of the civil parish as of the 2011 census was 191.

References

External links 

Civil parishes in North Yorkshire